Alexander Burdon (31 March 1879 – 13 December 1943) was an Australian rugby union and pioneer professional rugby league footballer - a dual-code rugby international.

He was one of the founding fathers of rugby league in Australia, representing the Kangaroos in the first two Tests played in 1908 and 1909. He was the fourth captain of the Australian team enjoying that honour in the deciding Test of the inaugural tour.

Rugby union career 
Born in Glebe, New South Wales he played first grade for the district from 1902 and the following year represented Sydney, then New South Wales. He made his Australian representative test debut as prop, against the All Blacks in the 22–3 victory in Sydney, on 15 August 1903. 

In 1904 he represented against England then toured New Zealand in 1905.

Folklore would suggest that Burdon's injury on the 1907 New South Wales Rugby tour of Queensland and the resultant unfairness of him having to pay his medical expenses while suffering a loss of wages, was a catalyst leading to the 1907 split away from rugby union. Similar sentiments in the north of England for working-class players who could not afford time off due to injury had indeed prompted the changes that formed the new "Northern Union" two years earlier. However the movement to start a rugby league competition in Sydney was already well under way before Burdon's injury.

Rugby league career 

Burdon joined the newly formed Glebe Rugby League Club in 1908 and was named the club's foundation captain.

He was one of the five selectors for the Pioneer Kangaroo tour of England. He played in 25 tour matches including the first and second Anglo-Australian Test matches. Eight former Wallabies had debuted for the Kangaroos in the Matches against New Zealand earlier that year, Burdon's league Test debut in the first Test against England with Pat Walsh made them the 9th and 10th Australian dual code internationals. He is listed on the Australian Players Register as Kangaroo No. 29.

In The First Kangaroos, a 1988 British–Australian made for TV sports film, Bluey Burdon's role was played by Philip Quast.

Playing record 
 Club: Glebe Rugby League Club1908-10 20 games, 3 tries
 Representative: Australia (1908–09) 2 Tests.

Sources 
 Whiticker, Alan (2004) Captaining the Kangaroos, New Holland, Sydney

References

1879 births
1943 deaths
Australian rugby union players
Australian rugby league players
Glebe rugby league players
Australia national rugby league team captains
Australia national rugby league team players
Dual-code rugby internationals
Australia international rugby union players
Rugby league players from Sydney
Rugby union players from Sydney
Rugby union props